The Columbia County School District (CCSD) is a school district based in Lake City, Florida that encompasses the entire Columbia County, Florida. 
The district is controlled jointly by the five members of the Columbia County Board of Education and the Superintendent of Schools, both elected by county voters. The CCSD currently operates a total of 16 schools: 9 elementary schools, 3 middle schools, 3 high schools, and an alternative school. The district's offices are located in the historic Columbia County High School building, constructed in 1921, at 372 West Duval Street.

High schools in the district include Fort White High School, Columbia High School (Lake City, Florida), and Challenge Learning Center at 1301 N. W. LaBonte Lane in Lake City. Middle schools are Fort White Middle School in Fort White, Florida; Lake City Middle School in Lake City; and Richardson Middle School in Lake City. The district's elementary schools are Columbia City Elementary, Eastside Elementary, Five Points Elementary, Fort White Elementary, Melrose Park Elementary, Niblack Elementary, Pinemount Elementary, Summers Elementary and Westside Elementary. The elementary schools are all located in Lake City except for Fort White Elementary which is located in Fort White. The District also oversees the Chrysalis Center at 446 West Duval Street an adult education program at 409 SW Saint Johns Street in Lake City and charter schools: Shining Star Academy of the Arts (approved in 2013) and Belmont Academy Charter School.

School Board
There are five elected members of the school board serving staggered four-year terms.  Districts 1, 3 & 5 were elected in 2010, and districts 2 & 4 were elected in 2012. Current members and their districts are: (4) Keith Hudson - Vice Chairman, (1) Linard Johnson, (5) Stephanie K. Finnell, (2) Dana Glenn Brady, and (3) Steve Nelson - Chairman.

Superintendent
The Superintendent of Schools is Terry Huddleston, whose four-year term expired in 2016.

Accreditation
The Columbia County School District is accredited by AdvancED, the premier accreditation organization in the world. AdvancED serves a global education community with a deep commitment to education excellence and the success of all students now and in the future. AdvancED systems and tools probe internal and external perspectives, each critical to powerful school improvement.

Other education
The school district also provides Career and Adult Education services for residents.

Adult Education provides an opportunity for individuals to earn a GED or High School diploma, learn academic skills required for employment or subsequent training, and become literate.

The Even Start program helps parents provide a good learning environment for their children, which also improves their own educational and parenting skills to promote family literacy.

Career and Technical Education can be utilized by students and working adults to explore interests and vocations, acquire employability skills, and experience contextual learning.

Project NET assists individuals in the transition from GED to college or technical training.

References

External links

School districts in Florida
Education in Columbia County, Florida